Héctor Pérez García (January 17, 1914 – July 26, 1996) was a Mexican-American physician, surgeon, World War II veteran, civil rights advocate, and founder of the American GI Forum (AGIF). As a result of the national prominence he earned through his work on behalf of Hispanic Americans, he was instrumental in the appointment of Vicente T. Ximenes, a Mexican American and AGIF charter member, to the Equal Employment Opportunity Commission in 1966.

García was named as alternate representative to the United Nations in 1967; was appointed to the US Commission on Civil Rights in 1968; was awarded the Presidential Medal of Freedom, the nation's highest civilian honor, in 1984; and was named to the Order of St. Gregory the Great by Pope John Paul II in 1990. In 1998, he was posthumously given the Order of the Aztec Eagle, Mexico's highest award for foreigners, in a ceremony in Corpus Christi.

Early life
García was born in the city of Llera, Tamaulipas, Mexico, to José García and Faustina Pérez García, both school teachers. His family fled the violence of the Mexican Revolution in 1917, legally immigrating to Mercedes, Texas. His father's professional credentials were not recognized in this new country, so he went into the dry goods business. Both parents instilled a love and respect for education in all of their children and expected them all to become medical doctors. García and five of his siblings—José Antonio García, Clotilde Pérez García, Cuitláhuac Pérez García, Xicotencátl Pérez García, and Dalia García-Malison—did become physicians. In 1929, García joined the Citizens' Military Training Corps (CMTC), a peacetime branch of the US Army for youths. He graduated from a segregated high school in 1932. That year, he earned a commission from the CMTC with a rank equivalent to a second lieutenant in the US infantry. He began attending Edinburg Junior College, to and from which he had to hitchhike  daily. His father had to cash in his life insurance policy to finance young García's education. In 1932, García entered the University of Texas at Austin, graduating with a degree in zoology. He was one of the top five of his class. He went on to study at the University of Texas Medical Branch, earning his doctorate in medicine in 1940. He accomplished his residency at St. Joseph's Hospital at Creighton University in Omaha, Nebraska, in 1942.

Army career
Upon completing his internship in 1942, García was called to active duty in the army, as the US had entered World War II. He was placed in command of a company of infantry. Later, he commanded a company of combat engineers before being transferred to the medical corps. He was stationed in Europe, and eventually rose to the rank of major. He earned the Bronze Star Medal, the European African Middle Eastern Medal with six bronze stars, and the World War II Victory Medal. While in Italy, he met and fell in love with Wanda Fusillo of Naples, whom he married in 1945.

Life after the war
In 1945, with the war over, Dr. García returned to Southern Texas with his wife Wanda, settling in Corpus Christi. Their first child, Daisy Wanda, was born in 1946. The League of United Latin American Citizens (LULAC) had been formed in the city seven years previously by Hispanic veterans to defend the rights of Hispanic-American citizens. García opened a private medical practice with his brother José Antonio; they treated all patients regardless of their ability to pay.

In 1947, García was elected president of the local chapter of LULAC. In the same year, he was hospitalized with life-threatening acute nephritis. While recuperating, he heard the local superintendent of the school district talking about the racial segregation in his district. Southern states had established a binary system, classifying all people as mainly either black or white, or Hispanic in some states like Texas, and segregating public facilities by race. At that moment, he made a private oath that, if he recovered, he would dedicate his life to gaining the equality of his people.

Founding of AGIF
After being discharged from the hospital, García began helping other Mexican-American veterans file claims with the Veteran's Administration (VA). He helped veterans to obtain services from the VA since the administration was slow to respond to the Hispanic-American veterans' needs. In 1948, he began an investigation of conditions for migrant laborers in Mathis, Texas. He found the impoverished workers to be ill-clothed, malnourished, and diseased from lack of basic sanitation.

On March 26 of the same year, he called a meeting to address the concerns of Mexican-American veterans. This meeting was a catalyst for developing AGIF, which soon had chapters in 40 Texas cities. It became the primary vehicle by which Mexican-American veterans expressed their discontent with the official discrimination against them and asserted their right to equality. They chose this name to emphasize that AGIF's participants were American citizens entitled to their constitutional rights. Later, AGIF's patriotism would exempt them from FBI infiltration at a time when the agency accused many Mexican-American organizations of having Marxist sympathies.

Felix Z. Longoria Jr.
In 1945, a Japanese sniper killed Mexican-American private Felix Z. Longoria Jr. in the Philippines. His body was returned to Texas in 1949. His widow's request to use the funeral chapel in Three Rivers was denied, as the funeral director claimed that "the whites won't like it". Dr. García and AGIF intervened, petitioning freshman US Senator Lyndon B. Johnson for redress of the outrage. Johnson secured Longoria's burial in Arlington National Cemetery, where he became the first Mexican American to be awarded this honor. When New York Times reported on the case, it gained national attention, and AGIF was propelled to the forefront of the movement for civil rights. Following this incident, AGIF expanded into the states of New Mexico and Colorado.

AGIF in American politics
AGIF became a recognized voice for Mexican Americans in the post-World War II era. Besides providing veterans with a social and political network, AGIF took pragmatic actions: it raised funds to pay for poll taxes for the indigent, so they did not have a barrier to voting. It campaigned against the Bracero Program, which had recruited migrant laborers during the war years and was known for discriminatory abuses. Dr. García testified before the National Advisory Committee on Farm Labor, asserting that "The migrant problem is not only a national emergency, it has become a national shame on the American conscience." This work brought him into contact with such national political figures as Hubert Humphrey, Arthur Goldberg, and George McGovern. The organization, and the attention it drew to poverty and discrimination in Texas, also got the attention of Look. It published an article on the high rates of diphtheria, infant diarrhea, and tuberculosis suffered by the neglected community.

García also worked to bring national attention to the conditions of schools for children in South Texas. In 1950, he wrote a request to the Texas Department of Health, expressing concerns about sanitation and mandating inspection to prevent disease or epidemics. García also voiced his opposition to segregation of schools and discrimination in the classroom.

Many whites expressed opposition toward García and felt threatened by the work of AGIF. One hostile letter threatened García, comparing him to Joseph Stalin and saying that Texans should "drive [him] back to Mexico".

In 1953, AGIF published its own study, "What Price Wetbacks", on the issues related to farm labor in South Texas. They invited Senator Lyndon Johnson to speak at their statewide convention. In 1954, attorneys funded by AGIF and LULAC argued and won Hernandez v. Texas in the Supreme Court. The decision, one of the Warren court's first, threw out the plaintiff's murder conviction on the grounds that he had not had a jury of his peers. Court records showed that no one with a Spanish surname had served on a jury in the county for 25 years. In Brown v. Board of Education, the Supreme Court ruled that racial segregation of public schools was unconstitutional. LULAC and AGIF mounted litigation challenges in Texas to ensure that the ruling was applied to gain integrated education for Mexican-American citizens. They took cases to the Texas Supreme Court challenging the practices of independent school districts in Driscoll, Carrizo Springs, and Kingsville.

In 1960, Dr. García became national coordinator of the Viva Kennedy Campaign, organized to elect Senator John F. Kennedy as president. García is credited with delivering 85 percent of the Hispanic vote to the Democratic party in that close election. The civil rights agenda of AGIF, however, was not at the forefront of the Kennedy administration's platform. Dr. García and his supporters had to accept his appointment in 1962 as representative of the US in mutual defense treaty talks with the West Indies Federation. The appointment was notable as the first instance that a Mexican American had represented an American President, and talks were successful. After Kennedy was assassinated, Vice-President Lyndon B. Johnson succeeded to the presidency. He appointed García as Presidential Representative, with the rank of Special Ambassador, to the presidential inauguration ceremonies of Dr. Raúl Leoni in Venezuela.

In 1966, through the efforts of AGIF and other groups, the state legislature voted to repeal the Texas poll tax, which had been a barrier to voting by poor people. The forum also undertook a march on the Texas state capital to protest the low wages of Mexican agricultural laborers. In 1967, President Johnson appointed Dr. García as alternate representative, with the full rank of Ambassador to the UN. He was tasked with improving US relations with Latin American nations. García made history on October 26 when he addressed the UN in Spanish; he was the first US representative to speak before the UN in a language other than English.

Starting in 1968, Dr. García and other members of AGIF began accompanying families of fallen soldiers to the airport to collect their sons' bodies when they were returned from Vietnam. He would often eulogize the soldier and never refused a request to speak at any funeral.

In the same year, President Johnson appointed García to the US Commission on Civil Rights. In 1972, Dr. García was arrested at a sit-in protest of the de facto segregation in Corpus Christi school district. He consulted with President Carter several times during the 1970s. In 1987, he became involved in the struggle against the campaign to designated English as the only official language of the US; the rate of Hispanic and Latino immigration to the country had increased, bringing many new Spanish speakers. His final project was to improve the standard of living in the colonias in the Rio Grande Valley along the US–Mexico border.

Death
García died July 26, 1996, in Corpus Christi, Texas, at age 82. He was buried at Seaside Memorial Park in Corpus Christi. President Bill Clinton presented a eulogy for him.

Honors and awards
Dr. García received numerous awards from various governments and other organizations during his lifetime. They include:
The US Army's Bronze Star Medal, the European African Middle Eastern Campaign Medal with six bronze stars, and the World War II Victory Medal, 1942–1946
AGIF's Medalla al Merito, 1952, for his work with Mexican-American veterans
National Coordinator and National Organizer of the "Viva Kennedy" clubs, 1960
Representative of President John F. Kennedy and member of the American Delegation signing treaty concerning Mutual Defense Area Agreement between the US and the Federation of the West Indies, 1961
Appointed as presidential representative with the rank of Special Ambassador to the inauguration of Dr. Raul Leoni, President of Venezuela, 1964
Accompanied Vice-President Hubert H. Humphrey and the US Delegation for the signing of the Treaty of Tlatelolco in Mexico City, 1967
The Republic of Panama's Condecoracion, Orden Vasco Nunez de Balboa, with the rank of commander, 1965
The 8th US Marine Corps District honored him with a plaque in recognition of his service to the war deceased, 1967
A humanitarian award from the Corpus Christi chapter of the National Association for the Advancement of Colored People, 1969
The Distinguished Service Award from the National Office of Civil Rights, 1980
The Presidential Medal of Freedom, 1984
Honor Al Merito Medalla Cura Jose Maria Morelos y Pavon A.D.P.E., Mexico City, Mexico
Corpus Christi Human Relations Commission's Community Service Award, 1987
The Coalition of Hispanic Health and Human Services Organization's Humanitarian Award, 1988
The National Hispanic Heritage Foundation's Hispanic Heritage Award in Leadership, 1989
The Midwest/Northeast Voter Registration Project's National Hispanic Hero Award, 1989
Received the "Distinguished Alumnus Award" from the University of Texas Ex-Students Association, 1989
Dr. Garcia designated Corpus Christi State University as the institution to house his papers in the Special Collections and Archives Department of the Library, 1990
MAPA Award for outstanding service to Hispanics from the Mexican American Physicians' Association, 1990
The National Association of Hispanic Journalists' Distinguished Lifetime Service Award, 1990
The Equestrian Order of Pope Gregory the Great from Pope John Paul II, 1990
Corpus Christi State University's first honorary doctorate of Humane Letters, 1991
The Dr. Hector P. Garcia Plaza and Statue were dedicated at Texas A&M University–Corpus Christi, 1996
Hector P. Garcia Elementary School, Grand Prairie, Texas, opened, 1997
Hector P. Garcia Elementary School, Temple, Texas, opened, 1998
Dr. García's image was placed on the US Treasury's $75 I Bond series honoring great Americans, 1999
Hector Garcia Place is a short street named after Dr. García, located in downtown Pueblo, Colorado
The Hector P. Garcia Middle School, Dallas, Texas, opened in 2007
The Major Hector P. Garcia, MD High School opened in Chicago, Illinois, in 2008
Texas State Highway 286 was named the Dr. Hector P. Garcia Memorial Highway in April, 2008
The Dr. Hector P. Garcia Middle School was established and dedicated in San Antonio, Texas, in October, 2009
Bronze bust of Dr. Héctor P. García was dedicated at the Dr. Hector P. Garcia Public Library, Mercedes, Texas, in January, 2012
Texas Historical Marker unveiled at the Dr. Hector P. Garcia Public Library, Mercedes, Texas, in 2013
Dr. Hector P. Garcia's Official 100th Birthday Celebration observed in Corpus Christi, Texas, January 17, 2014
Texas Historical Marker unveiled at Christus Spohn Memorial Hospital, Corpus Christi, Texas, February, 2014
Dr. Hector P. Garcia Memorial Family Health Center approved by Nueces County Commissioners and the Hospital District to be opened in 2016
Dr. Hector P. Garcia Drive in Rancho Vista subdivision, Corpus Christi, Texas, unveiled by Braselton Homes, January 13, 2015
Points of Light Monument Organization reveals its next recipient will be Dr. Héctor P. García, January 15, 2016

Legacy
As one of the early leaders of the Hispanic civil rights, García's activities foreshadowed much of the struggle of the Chicano Movement. As a figure of national and international prominence, the effects of his life have been felt at all levels of society, from the poor barrios that he fought to improve, to the highest echelons of government. The end of the 1950s desegregated Texan hotels, cinemas, and restaurants. Beauty parlors and barbershops were desegregated in the 1960s, with cemeteries and swimming pools not being opened to Mexican Americans until the 1970s.

In the realm of popular culture, in 1950, Pulitzer Prize winner Edna Ferber interviewed García to get a sense of the Mexican American experience in Texas. She later wrote the 1952 novel Giant, basing some of the incidents in the work on her interview. The book was later turned into a 1956 film starring James Dean, Elizabeth Taylor, Rock Hudson, and Dennis Hopper.

In 1985, the Dr. Héctor Pérez García Endowed Chair was created at Yale University. In 1988, the main branch of the Corpus Christi post office was renamed in his honor. In 1996, a  statue of him was dedicated at Texas A&M University–Corpus Christi. In 1999, his image was placed on the US Treasury's $75 I Bond series honoring great Americans.

In 2002, public television station KEDT in Corpus Christi, Texas, produced a documentary on him entitled "Justice for my People: The Dr. Hector P. Garcia Story". The program was broadcast nationally on PBS.

Under Senate Bill 495, signed on May 30, 2009, by the governor of Texas, the state of Texas established the third Wednesday of each September as "Dr. Hector P. Garcia Texas State Recognition Day".

In April 2010, the US House of Representatives passed H.CON.RES.222, recognizing the leadership and historical contributions of Dr. Héctor García to the Hispanic community and his remarkable efforts to combat racial and ethnic discrimination in the US.

References

Bibliography
 García, Ignacio M. Hector P. García: In Relentless Pursuit of Justice. Houston: Arte Publico Press (2002). 
 Ramos, Henry. The American GI Forum: In Pursuit of the Dream, 1948-1983. Houston: Arte Publico Press (1998). 
 Garcia-Akers, Cecilia. "The Inspiring Life of Texan Hector P. Garcia". Charleston: The History Press (2016).

External links
The Hector P. Garcia papers at the Bell Library of Texas A&M Corpus Christi
American G.I. Forum National site
American G.I. Forum of California
Hector P. Garcia: A Texas Legend
Felix Z. Longoria
Justice for my People: The Dr. Hector P. Garcia Story
A site about the treasury bonds
From the U.S. Army
For Community & Country: The Life and Legacy of Dr. Hector P. Garcia
Dr. Hector P. Garcia Papers Finding Aid
Dr. Hector P. Garcia Memorial Foundation

 https://www.utmb.edu/drgarcia/world.htm

United States Army Medical Corps officers
Activists for Hispanic and Latino American civil rights
United States Army personnel of World War II
United States Army officers
Presidential Medal of Freedom recipients
Mexican emigrants to the United States
1914 births
Knights of St. Gregory the Great
1996 deaths
People from Corpus Christi, Texas
People from Mercedes, Texas